The Cork-Meath rivalry is a Gaelic football rivalry between Irish county teams Cork and Meath, who first played each other in 1967. It is considered to be one of the most bitter rivalries in modern Gaelic games. Cork's home ground is Páirc Uí Chaoimh and Meath's home ground is Páirc Tailteann, however, all of their championship meetings have been held at neutral venues, usually Croke Park.

While Cork have the second highest number of Munster titles and Meath are second to Dublin in Leinster, they have also enjoyed success in the All-Ireland Senior Football Championship, having won 14 championship titles between them to date.

Statistics

All-time results

Legend

Senior

Records

Top scorers

References

Meath
Meath county football team rivalries